Carlo Natale Marino Conti (born 13 March 1961), simply known as Carlo Conti, is an Italian television presenter.

Life and career 
Born in Florence, Conti graduated in accountancy, then he was a bank teller from 1981 to 1986. After some experiences in radio as a presenter and a DJ, he debuted as a television presenter in 1985, hosting the Rai 1 musical show Discoring.

He later hosted several successful TV programmes, including Aria fresca, L'eredità, I migliori anni, Tale e Quale Show, Domenica in and five editions of Miss Italia.

In 2014, Conti was named as a host and the artistic director of the Sanremo Music Festival for 2015. He continued in these roles for the 2016 edition of the festival and did so again in 2017.

On 15 June 2011, an asteroid was named after him, 78535 Carloconti. He considers himself Roman Catholic.

References

External links

 
 

1961 births
Living people
Mass media people from Florence
Italian television presenters
Beauty pageant hosts
Italian Roman Catholics